Known Associates is the ninth studio album by Mr. Serv-On released on March 4, 2014. It was his first collaboration album.  He collaborated with rapper SC on this album.

Track listing
 Known Associates Intro
 Don't Make Me Get It (Ft. C-Robba & B-Eazy)
 Like They Don't Know Me (Ft. Koopsta Knicca)
 Gangster (Ft. Brotha Lynch Hung)
 Investigation Continues
 Coward (feat. Sunna Man, WISH & Diesel)
 Smoke Again
 Arrogant Money (feat. Justhis)
 Mayor Is On the Team (Outro)
 It's Goin' Down (feat. Q-Ballsilini)

References

Mr. Serv-On albums
2014 albums